Reinhold Georg Schmaeling (1840-1917) was a Baltic German architect of the city of Riga during years 1879 to 1915. 

Schmaeling is notable in the history of Riga for his unique style of red brick architecture. From his architectural drawings, almost 100 buildings have been built in Riga, including 25 schools, 3 hospitals, 5 fire departments, 2 markets, night shelters, kindergartens, administrative buildings, cultural institutions, sports and religious buildings, barracks and residential buildings, which are integral to today's architectural environment of Riga. 

Schmaeling is one of the architects included in the Latvian cultural canon.

Biography 
Reinhold Georg Schmaeling was born in 1840 in Riga, Governorate of Livonia in a Baltic German family. He received his first education in a private primary school in Riga. In 1854, at age 14, Schmaeling went to Saint Petersburg to study mechanical engineering at the Institute of Technology, but had to leave because of his health. He then attended Larin Gymnasium and, since 1856, a drawing class at the Saint Petersburg Academy of Arts, where he became more and more interested in the subject, and in 1858 he entered the Department of Architecture of the Academy of Arts. 

From 1860 to 1862, in addition to his studies, Schmaeling worked for the architect and professor Ludwig Bohnstedt, who is known as the author of many public buildings in Finland, Russia, Germany and elsewhere, including the Riga National Theater (now Latvian National Opera).

Later, he received a travel grant 'pension' from his faculty, which made possible for their students to improve their professional skills abroad for four years. Subsequently in 1869, when Schmaeling went to study in Germany, he married Marie Eveline von Tiesenhausen and they had a son Willy, who died prematurely of diphtheria. Then Schmaeling spent the next three years with his family in Italy.

Since 1873, Schmaeling had been working in Saint Petersburg, then for a while in Crimea, but since 1877 - again in Saint Petersburg, in the Department of Apanage. During this time, Schmaeling also led the arrangement of the Russian pavilion at the 1873 Vienna World's Fair. In 1874, a son, Woldemar, was born into the Schmaeling family, and in 1877, son Alexander. 

In 1879, Schmaeling accepted an invitation to become an architect of the city of Riga, becoming a successor of architect Johann Daniel Felsko. Returning to his hometown, he dedicated most of his creative life for it - 36 years. At the beginning of the 20th century, when most of the buildings designed by Schmaeling were built, several other architects also worked in his office - Leopold Riemer, Rudolph Tode, Boris von Bock, Nikolai Nord and Gottfriedt Croon, who are not the only co-authors of Schmaeling's work. 

In 1915, Schmaeling retired and two years later, in 1917 he died and was buried in the Great Cemetery of Riga. 

Alexander (1877-1961), the son of Reinhold Schmaeling, was also a well-known Art Nouveau architect in Riga. Alexander's grandson Anthony Zbigniew was also an architect who lived in the Istrian peninsula in Croatia.

Architectural works 
Few of the most notable include:
 Āgenskalns Market (1911)
 Vidzeme Market (1902)
 Pumping station at Eksporta iela 2b (1908)
 Riga city 1st hospital
 Pauls Stradiņš Clinical University Hospital (formerly Riga 2nd hospital) at Pilsoņu iela 13 (1908–1915) 
 Residential buildings
 Miera iela 5 (1912)
 Matīsa iela 9 (1902)
 Ģertrūdes iela 38 (1907)

List of buildings

References 

19th-century German architects
Baltic German people from the Russian Empire